José María Palomo (24 July 1946 – 30 November 2020) was a Spanish bobsledder. He competed in the two-man event at the 1968 Winter Olympics.

References

1946 births
2020 deaths
Spanish male bobsledders
Olympic bobsledders of Spain
Bobsledders at the 1968 Winter Olympics
Sportspeople from Barcelona